Crossfade is an American rock band formed in Columbia, South Carolina, United States, in 1993. Before settling on the Crossfade name in 2002, the band had previously existed under the names The Nothing and Sugardaddy Superstar. As of 2019, their current lineup includes Ed Sloan on lead vocals and guitar, Les Hall on lead guitar, keyboard, and backing vocals, Mitch James on backing vocals and bass and Ryan Yerdon on drums. Since their formation, Crossfade has released three studio albums – their self-titled debut album in 2004, Falling Away in 2006, and We All Bleed in 2011.

History

Early years, Crossfade and Falling Away (1993–2007)
Crossfade was formed in 1993, originally under the name The Nothing. The band consisted of Ed Sloan on lead guitar and vocals, Mitch James on bass guitar and backing vocals, and Brian Geiger on drums. They released two records, The Nothing (1994) and Numb (1998). The song "Breathing Slowly", originally from Numb, was re-recorded eight years later on Falling Away. By 2000, The Nothing had changed their name to Sugardaddy Superstar, after vocalist and DJ Tony Byroads joined the band. The band recorded songs in the "Sugardaddy Studio," a studio that lead singer Ed Sloan had built in his garage. The songs eventually attracted the interest of the Los Angeles, California A&R company Taxi (Independent A&R), and HitPredictor co-founder and FG Records/Earshot head Doug Ford which ultimately led to the signing of a record deal with the FG Records/Earshot division of Columbia Records.

In 2002, they changed their name once again, this time to Crossfade. That year the band entered the studio to record two more songs to add to the eight they had recorded in the "Sugardaddy Studio" for their debut album. They released their first album, Crossfade, on April 13, 2004. The first single off the album, "Cold," gave the band significant mainstream exposure. Two singles followed afterward in 2005: "So Far Away" and "Colors." In February 2005, their Crossfade album was certified Gold by the RIAA and was later certified Platinum in August 2005. Crossfade had with "So Far Away" their debut radio broadcast on 94.5 the Buzz (Houston, Texas) Cage Match at 10 o'clock p.m. where it competed with a new song every night and won out over the competition for over three weeks. At the time, Crossfade's single had been the longest lasting song on the Cage Match since its founding. That year, Tony Byroads left the band to start a family and was not replaced.

After coming off the success of their first album, the band began to write a follow-up. In 2006, James Branham replaced drummer Brian Geiger, who left the group to dedicate himself to his auto  detailing business. Crossfade's second album, Falling Away, was released on August 29, 2006. The album spawned three singles: "Invincible," "Drown You Out," and "Already Gone." After releasing the album, they needed another guitarist for their upcoming tour. Les Hall, an old friend of Ed Sloan, filled the position. After touring, Hall wanted to become an official member of the band and he asked if he could take part in the songwriting. Sloan accepted and Les Hall became Crossfade's lead guitarist and keyboardist. Though their debut album sold over one million copies, Falling Away only sold 200,000.

New label, switching drummers, We All Bleed and hiatus (2008–2016) 
In 2008, the band was dropped from Columbia Records. The band signed with Eleven Seven Music. After drummer James Branham left and formed a new band, A Fall From Down, he was replaced by temporary member Will Hunt for the recording of the album.

On January 2, 2009, Crossfade released a demo track entitled "We All Bleed." It was announced that they would be releasing a new album later that year. According to the band, the new album would have a darker, and possibly different, sound than their previous releases.

In June 2010, the track listing for We All Bleed was revealed, and the first single, "Killing Me Inside," was released along with a music video. The release date for We All Bleed was originally October 26, 2010, but was pushed back first to January 2011, then April 12, 2011, before being pushed back a third time to June 21, 2011. The album closer track "Make Me A Believer" was made available for download for free in the meantime, which is the longest song the band has ever recorded. Around that time after the album was finished recording, studio drummer Will Hunt became the drummer of American rock band, Evanescence, with whom he toured in 2007.

On November 24, 2010, Crossfade announced on their YouTube channel, CrossfadeMusicTV, that Mark Castillo from the metalcore band Bury Your Dead would be the band's new drummer.

The same day that the first single "Killing Me Inside" was officially released to digital retailers, the band announced on their Twitter that the album would finally be released on June 21, 2011. In November, the band also released the second single, "Prove You Wrong," and released the music video for the song in December.

In 2011, Crossfade headlined Rockapalooza in Jackson, Michigan.

Crossfade supported Papa Roach and Buckcherry on the Rock Allegiance Tour in 2011 with Puddle of Mudd, P.O.D., Red, and Drive A.

In January 2012, drummer Mark Castillo announced on his Facebook that he had left Crossfade to pursue a career in the metalcore band Emmure.

Despite a lengthy period of inactivity, the band had not broken up as of August 2016. Sloan took to Facebook to address rumors of the band's demise in the meantime.

In October 2017, Ed Sloan said on Facebook that an upcoming solo album was underway and that its debut single "Surrender", would be released on November 10. An acoustic version of "Surrender" was later released. On January 1, 2018, former drummer from Puddle of Mudd Ryan Yerdon joined Crossfade as a new drummer. On February 2, 2018, Ed released his second solo single titled "Alive." An official music video was released a month later. On March 30, 2018, Ed released his third solo single titled "Without You."

Band members

Current members
 Ed Sloan – lead vocals, rhythm guitar (1993–present), lead guitar (1993–2006)
 Mitch James – bass, backing vocals (1993–present)
 Les Hall – lead guitar, keyboards, sampling, backing vocals (2006–present)
 Ryan Yerdon – drums (2018–present)

Former touring members
 Will Hunt – drums (2008–2010)

Former members
 Tony Byroads – turntables, vocals, sampling (1999–2005)
 Brian Geiger – drums (1993–2004)
 James Branham – drums (2004–2008)
 Mark Castillo – drums (2010–2012)

Timeline

Discography

Studio albums

Singles

Music videos
 "Cold" (2004)
 "Colors" (2005)
 "Invincible" (2006)
 "Drown You Out" (2006)
 "Killing Me Inside" (2011)
 "Prove You Wrong" (2011)
 "Dear Cocaine" (2012)

References

External links

American post-grunge musical groups
American alternative metal musical groups
Musical groups from South Carolina
Musical groups established in 1993
Heavy metal musical groups from South Carolina
Musical groups from Columbia, South Carolina
American nu metal musical groups